Trigonoceras is an extinct genus of prehistoric nautiloids from the nautilid family Trigonoceratidae that lived during the Early Carboniferous in what is now western Europe.

Trigonoceras has a very loosely coiled gyroconic or cyrtoconic shell with a subtriangular cross section, as indicated by fragmentary specimens. The venter on the outer rim or convex side is broad and transversely concave with angular shoulders; the sides which converge on a narrow dorsum are broadly convex. The siphuncle is slightly dorsal of the center and is orthochoanitic.(B.1964.) A member of the Trigonoceratidae, Trigonoceras is also a component of the superfamily Trigonocerataceae

References

 ,B.1964. Nautiloidea-Nautilida in the Treatise on Invertebrate Paleontology Part K; Geological Society of America and University of Kansas Press
 (Cephalopda) -Sepkoski's Online Genus Database

Prehistoric nautiloid genera